Aventus is an eau de parfum launched by Paris-based perfume house Creed. The fragrance was released in September 2010 as part of the celebrations for Creed's 250th anniversary.

Overview
Olivier Creed, the master perfumier for Creed, claims that his inspiration for Aventus was the French military and political leader Napoleon Bonaparte. As a result of this, many of the scents found within the fragrance have a link to Napoleon. For example, Blackcurrants from Corsica (where Napoleon was born), and Birch from Louisiana (which Napoleon ruled over for 4 years), are used.

It was announced in Spring 2016, that a variation of the fragrance aimed at the female market, Aventus for Her, which would be released on June, 2016 in the UK, with a US release coming in November of the same year.

Aventus costs $425 for 3.3oz as of April 2018.

Scent
Aventus is an example of a fruity chypre fragrance, meaning it features mainly Citrus based top notes, and Animalic base notes, such as Oak Moss or Musk. Olivier Creed has stated that, unlike the majority of perfume houses, the Creed brand focuses more on the Base notes, rather than the Top. The reason for this, they claim, is that focusing on the base notes means to fully appreciate the fragrance the wearer must take their time in order to fully understand it.
The full note pyramid is as follows:

Batch Variations

Aventus has gathered some criticism over the years for their inconsistent batches. Where some batches are considered more fruity, others have been considered more smokey. Although there is no way to prove that the batches vary regarding the content of a certain ingredient, the amount of comments and reviews on social media platforms and the internet in general gives a strong indication that Aventus indeed varies from batch to batch.

Reviews
 

Aventus garnered critical acclaim from fashion critics and the general public alike and has a rating of 4.5 out of 5 stars on the fragrance website Basenotes based on an average of 1312 votes. In terms of awards, Aventus won the Best Ever Men's Fragrance award in 2013 from Basenotes, as well as Best Niche Fragrance at the Shortlist Grooming awards, in addition to the Best New Male Fragrance in Limited Distribution prize at the 2011 COPRA (Cosmetic & Perfumery Retailers Association) Awards. 2021, the Fragrance Foundation Austria awarded the prestigious perfume prize DUFTSTARS at a festive gala in the Museumsquartier in Vienna.

Such was the success of Aventus, that Creed bill it as their most popular fragrance in their 250-year history, whilst Erwin Creed would go on to say in an interview that without Aventus, Creed wouldn't have opened their boutique in Madison Avenue, New York City.

References

External links
 Aventus at Basenotes
 Aventus at Fragrantica

Perfumes
Products introduced in 2010